Frank S. Shipp (July 23, 1884 – December 10, 1934) was a college football and baseball player.

Sewanee
He was a prominent running back for the Sewanee Tigers football team of Sewanee: The University of the South, selected second-team for an all-time Sewanee team.

1906
He was selected All-Southern at end by Dan McGugin.

1907
Shipp was selected All-Southern in 1907, one of Sewanee's greatest years.

Denver Bears
He played minor league baseball for the Denver Bears in the Western League.

References

1884 births
1934 deaths
American football halfbacks
American football ends
Sewanee Tigers football players
All-Southern college football players
Sportspeople from Chattanooga, Tennessee
Players of American football from Tennessee